Fox Valley Technical College (Fox Valley Tech or FVTC) is a public technical college in Grand Chute, Wisconsin.  It is a member of the Wisconsin Technical College System and serves people in the Appleton, Wisconsin/Fox Cities area. It serves about 50,000 people each year and offers more than 200 associate degree, technical diploma, and certificate programs as well as instruction related to 20 apprenticeship trades. It has credit transfer agreements with more than 30 four-year colleges and universities.

The main campus is in Grand Chute with a second campus in Oshkosh. FVTC has smaller regional centers in Chilton, Clintonville, Waupaca, and Wautoma. It also operates a Public Safety Training Center in Greenville.

History
Starting in 1912, city vocational schools were formed at six locations (Appleton, Brillion, Kaukauna, Menasha, Neenah, and Oshkosh) in the current district. In 1967, the Wisconsin Legislature divided the state into sixteen districts, which led to the formation of Fox Valley Technical Institute (FVTI). In 1987, the college (along with all of the state technical colleges) was renamed and it became known as Fox Valley Technical College.

Key dates in FVTC history

Presidents
William M. Sirek,   college's inception in 1967 – June 30, 1982
Dr. Stanley J. Spanbauer,   July 1, 1982 – June 30, 1993
Dr. H. Victor Baldi,   July 1, 1993 – December 31, 1999
Dr. Laurence F. Johnson,   July 1, 2000 – June 22, 2001
James Milslagle,   June 25, 2001 – December 31, 2001
Dr. David L. Buettner,   January 7, 2002 – August 15, 2008
Dr. Susan A. May,   July 1, 2008 – July 31, 2021
Dr. Chris Matheny,   August 1, 2021 – Present

Accreditation
FVTC is accredited by the Higher Learning Commission. FVTC has been accredited by this accreditor since 1970.

Special programs and facilities

Public Safety Training Center
In 2015, FVTC opened their Public Safety Training Center in Greenville on the south end of Appleton International Airport. The center contains multiple state of the art simulators as well as a mock town to train students enrolled in the school's public safety programs. The center has a Boeing 727 which was donated by FedEx Express. The facility is also used frequently by public safety agencies all over the United States for their regular training. Pierce Manufacturing also uses the center to test out their new fire apparatus.

In October 2018, FVTC started work on a $10.4 million expansion of the center which is being funded by the Federal Aviation Administration. The expansion will add facilities for aircraft firefighting training which will be used by aircraft rescue and firefighting personal from airports across the United States.

Flight school
FVTC has an FAA certified flight school offering pilot training, Aircraft maintenance technician (A&P), and aircraft electronics programs. The school is located in Oshkosh on the eastern edge of Wittman Regional Airport.

Ione's Dining Room 
FVTC's Appleton campus houses Ione's, a student-operated "full-service fine dining room and a premier learning lab for Culinary Arts students." The department of Culinary, Hotel and Restaurant Management had wanted to remodel the dining room and a 2002 gift from Ione Berg helped bring the goal to fruition. "Restaurant Operations, the course that is housed in Ione's Dining Room, is the capstone course of the College's Culinary Arts program. Students are expected to bring their skills together there, including all the cooking components, as well as management and leadership."

Images

References

External links

Official website

Wisconsin technical colleges
Buildings and structures in Appleton, Wisconsin
Buildings and structures in Oshkosh, Wisconsin
Educational institutions established in 1912
Educational institutions established in 1968
Education in Calumet County, Wisconsin
Education in Outagamie County, Wisconsin
Education in Winnebago County, Wisconsin
Education in Waupaca County, Wisconsin
1912 establishments in Wisconsin